Rudbar-e Qasran Rural District is in Rudbar-e Qasran District of Shemiranat County, Tehran province, Iran. At the National Census of 2006, its population was 8,594 in 2,544 households. There were 10,691 inhabitants in 3,529 households at the following census of 2011. At the most recent census of 2016, the population of the rural district was 7,051 in 2,478 households. The largest of its 28 villages was Ammameh, with 1,315 people.

References 

Shemiranat County

Rural Districts of Tehran Province

Populated places in Tehran Province

Populated places in Shemiranat County